The following neighborhoods exist within the city limits of Orlando, Florida.

Official neighborhoods
Orlando has defined the following neighborhoods to cover the entire area of the city.

Other neighborhoods
Downtown Orlando includes all or most of Callahan, Central Business District, Holden/Parramore, Lake Dot, Lake Eola Heights, South Eola, and North Quarter*Downtown South includes most of South Division and South Orange and the western half of Pineloch
Ivanhoe Village covers parts of Lake Formosa and North Orange
Curry Ford West covers the Curry Ford corridor from Gaston Foster to Fern Creek.
Lake Lawsona Historic District (locally defined) includes most of Lawsona/Fern Creek and Thornton Park
Lake Nona includes Education Village, Lake Nona Central, Lake Nona Estates, Lake Nona South, and NorthLake Park at Lake Nona
Mills 50 is centered on the intersection of Mills Avenue (SR 15) and Colonial Drive (SR 50), and includes parts of Colonialtown North/South, Rowena Gardens, Lake Eola Heights, and Park Lake/Highland
Southeast Orlando (east of Orlando International Airport) includes City of Orlando/GOAA, East Park, Lake Nona, and Southeastern Oaks; Bal Bay, LaVina, Narcoossee South, Randal Park, and Storey Park are in the area but have not opted into the sector plan
Traditional City (a zoning designation) includes Bel Air, College Park, Colonialtown North/South, Delaney Park, Downtown Orlando, East Central Park, Holden Heights, Lake Cherokee, Lake Como (part), Lake Copeland, Lake Davis/Greenwood, Lake Formosa, Lake Weldona, Lancaster Park, Lawsona/Fern Creek, North Orange, Orwin Manor, Park Lake/Highland, Rock Lake (part), Rowena Gardens, South Division, South Orange (part), Spring Lake (part), Thornton Park, and Wadeview Park

References

External links

City of Orlando Neighborhood Maps

 
Orlando
Neighborhoods